Phil Cavanagh is a politician from Michigan. Cavanagh is a former member of the Michigan House of Representatives from the 10th District (previously the 17th District before redistricting). He is the son of Jerome Cavanagh, who was Mayor of Detroit from 1962 to 1970.

Personal life 
Cavanagh's wife is Lily Cavanagh. They have three daughters. Cavanagh and his family live in Redford, Michigan. One of his daughters, Mary Cavanagh, was sworn in as a state representative on January 1, 2021.

References

External links 
 Phil Cavanagh at ballotpedia.org

Living people
Democratic Party members of the Michigan House of Representatives
21st-century American politicians
Year of birth missing (living people)
People from Redford, Michigan